Just Because! is a 2017 Japanese anime television series by Hajime Kamoshida, the author of The Pet Girl of Sakurasou and Rascal Does Not Dream of Bunny Girl Senpai, and Kiseki Himura, the author of Getsuyōbi no Tawawa. The 12-episode anime, produced by Pine Jam, aired between October and December 2017.

Characters

Main

A transfer student who come back to his hometown after four years. Because his father's job was often relocated, Eita often transferred schools. He was in baseball club along with Haruto during middle school. He has had a crush on Mio since middle school but could not confess to her.

The former student council president. Mio was Eita and Haruto's classmate during middle school. She plans to enroll in college and is studying hard to make that happen. Her unrequited feelings for Haruto since middle school still influence her, but as the series progresses, her feelings begin to change.

A baseball team member who has already secured a job after graduation. He and Eita are childhood friends. He has a crush on Hazuki and confesses his feelings but is rejected at first; however this changes over the series. Hazuki tells Haruto she won't date him until she is settled in college and Haruto finds a stable job and if he still loves her by that time.

Hazuki is a trump player from the school concert band that has already decided on her preferred college. She does not stand out in class, and seems uninterested in romantic relationships. Haruto has a crush on her and confesses his feelings but is rejected at first. However, over the course of the series, this changes. Hazuki tells Haruto she won't date him until she is settled in college, Haruto finds a stable job and if his feelings remain unchanged.

Ena is a second-year student, and a member of the photography club that is close to being disbanded. In order to save the club, she enters a photography competition. Later on, she develops a crush on Eita. She has a go-getter attitude, taking active steps to get what she wants, speaking her mind openly where everyone else is too nervous to speak up.

Others

Hazuki's best friend who constantly looks after her, speaks out on her behalf and helps her and Haruto get together. At one point she admits to Hazuki that she's also in love with someone, but refuses to say more.

Mio's best friend.

Mio's best friend.

Mio's best friend who hates Hazuki.

Haruto's best friend.

Haruto's best friend.

A second-year student and a member of the photography club.

A second-year student and a member of the photography club.

The homeroom teacher of Mio and Haruto's class.

Media

Anime
The project was first teased as an April's Fools joke in 2017 under title April 1st The Animation. It was later confirmed as real in the June issue of Gakken's Megami Magazine.

Kiseki Himura designed the characters, Atsushi Kobayashi directed the series with screenplay by Hajime Kamoshida. Hiroyuki Yoshii adapted Kiseki's art into animation. Keisuke Fukunaga produced the series. Pine Jam produced the animation. It aired from October 5 to December 28, 2017 on AT-X, Tokyo MX, TV Kanagawa, MBS, and BS Fuji's programming block Anime Guild. Nagi Yanagi served as music producer as well performed the opening theme titled "Over and Over", while Karin Isobe, Yuna Yoshino, and Lynn performed the ending theme "behind". Sentai Filmworks has licensed the series and streamed it on Amazon's Anime Strike service in the U.S.. Sentai released the series for home video with an English dub on February 12, 2019.

Episode list

Novel
A serialized novel adaptation of the anime was launched in Kadokawa's Da Vinci magazine starting October 2017 issue (released on September 6). The first chapter tells the prologue anime's plot. Atsushi Kobayashi illustrated the cover for the novel.

Web manga
A spin-off web manga series illustrated by Kamaboko RED is updated every day the anime's official Twitter account. Each chapter is two pages long.

References

External links
Official website 

2017 anime television series debuts
2017 Japanese novels
Anime Strike
Anime with original screenplays
AT-X (TV network) original programming
Drama anime and manga
Japanese serial novels
Media Works Bunko
NBCUniversal Entertainment Japan
Pine Jam
Sentai Filmworks
Slice of life anime and manga